Events in the year 1895 in Iceland.

Incumbents 

 Monarch: Christian IX
 Minister for Iceland: Johannes Nellemann

Events 

 Litlibær, a historical turf farmstead in Northwest Iceland was constructed.

Births 

 January 21 – Davíð Stefánsson, poet

References 

 
1890s in Iceland
Years of the 19th century in Iceland
Iceland
Iceland